Fantje iz gline is a novel by Slovenian author Janja Vidmar. It was first published in 2005.

See also
List of Slovenian novels

Slovenian novels
2005 novels